The Ilfracombe Academy  is a coeducational secondary school and sixth form with academy status, located in the North Devon town of Ilfracombe, England.

Originally opened by then Education Secretary Margaret Thatcher in 1970 and known as Ilfracombe School & Community College, it was the first purpose-built comprehensive school in the country. Subsequently, it was called Ilfracombe College. Since the early 1980s, facilities available to students have included a television studio with an editing suite. The buildings were designed by Messrs & stillman, Following fundraising and negotiations from 2001, the college was awarded specialist college Media Arts status in 2004 and was renamed Ilfracombe Arts College. In 2007, the school built a £3.4 million arts block named the Beacon Arts Centre. The arts department relocated to this department, freeing up rooms for other uses in the school. The previous art rooms were refurbished into new administration, student services, and learning support areas. The previous student services were refurbished into a conference room with video conferencing facilities. The school converted to academy status in May 2013, but continues to specialise in the arts.

The school used to broadcast students' radio shows in stereo on frequencies 103.6 & 107.7 MHz FM, up until the completion of a new school building in November 2017, when the old school was demolished to make space for new outdoor areas for students.

List of headteachers

 1970-unknown, Mr J. F. Gale
 2005–2006, Colin Eves
 2006–2010, Brian Sarahan
 2010–2019, Sharon Barnes/Marshall
 2019–present, Steve Rodgers

References

External links
 The Ilfracombe Academy official website

Secondary schools in Devon
Ilfracombe
Academies in Devon
Buildings and structures in Ilfracombe
1970 establishments in England
Educational institutions established in 1970